Pejepscot, Maine is a historical settlement first occupied by a subset of the Androscoggin Native Americans (Formerly known as the Anasagunticooks) known as the Wabanaki's.

History

Native Americans

Before the European colonization of the Americas, Pejepscot was inhabited by the Wabanaki Native Americans. The word Pejepscot has its roots in the Wabanaki language, and has different translations (long, rocky rapids part and crooked like a diving snake). This area refers to a specific section of the Androscoggin River, the major waterway and lifeblood for all that inhabited the region.

Pejepscot is the current towns of Brunswick, Topsham and Harpswell, Maine in Sagadahoc and Cumberland counties.

Colonization

in the year 1620, a charter was granted by King James II of England to forty noblemen, knights, and gentlemen, calling themselves the Plymouth Company. Their territory extended from the fourteenth to the forty-eighth parallel of latitude, and from sea to sea.

Arriving in 1628, the first permanent European settler in Pejepscot was Thomas Purchase from Dorchester, Dorset England. On June 16, 1632, the Plymouth Company granted a patent to Purchase and his brother in-law George Way for the lands at Pejepscot, in the current towns of Brunswick, Topsham and Harpswell Maine. Purchase settled at Pejepscot Falls adjacent to the Site of Fort Andross.

In the proceedings of the Plymouth Council in England, the following minutes were entered:

On August 22, 1639, purchase made a legal agreement with John Winthrop, Governor of Massachusetts, placing his land under the jurisdiction of that colony. This was a right to jurisdiction only, and not the soil.

On July 7, 1684, and after Purchase fled to Boston during King Philip's War, the land was next settled and purchased through Native Americans, by Richard Wharton, a Boston merchant,  with the exception of a few islands. In 1714. in the Massachusetts General Court, the land was sold to a group of Boston merchants. organized as the Pejepscot Proprietors. As a commercial enterprise, they sold land in small lots to establish a settlement. 

By 1715, in the Brunswick portion of Pejepscot, there were only thirty to forty residents. The region of Pejepscot kept that name and location until the Massachusetts General Court constituted the three towns.

Archaeological sites

Pejepscot Site

The Pejepscot Site is a prehistoric archaeological site on the banks of the Androscoggin River in Topsham, Maine.  The site is a small Native American habitation site dating to the Late woodland or early classic stage.  It was discovered in the 1980s during planning for a water power project on the river above Brunswick Falls.

Merrymeeting Bay Pioneers Project
In 2020 the Merrymeeting Bay Pioneers Project found a 17th century dwelling in a field at the Hunter Farm on Foreside Road in Topsham. The home, found in a field, was built with wood, clay and stone. Stones were placed below the timbers to keep them from rotting.

References

Further reading
 Pejepscot Historical Society
 History of Maine

History of Maine
Native American history of Maine
Archaeological sites on the National Register of Historic Places in Maine
National Register of Historic Places in Sagadahoc County, Maine
Pejepscot, Maine